The Erwin Cubs were a Minor League Baseball team that played in the Class D Appalachian League from 1943 to 1944. They were located in Erwin, Tennessee, and played their home games at Gentry Stadium. Known as the Erwin Aces in 1943, they became the Erwin Cubs in 1944 borrowing the moniker from the Chicago Cubs, with whom they were affiliated in both seasons. The Aces won the 1943 Appalachian League playoff championship.

History
Erwin had previously been home to the Appalachian League's Erwin Mountaineers in 1940.

The Erwin Aces began play in 1943 as the Class D affiliate of the Chicago Cubs. They were managed by Jim Poole, a former American League first baseman who served as a player-manager. The Aces opened the season at home with a 27–11 loss to the Johnson City Cardinals on May 4 at Gentry Stadium. Erwin finished the season with an even 53–53 (.500) record, placing third. All four of the circuit's teams participated in the playoffs. The Aces advanced to the finals by beating Johnson City, three games to one, in the semifinals. They then defeated the Bristol Twins, 4–3, in a best-of-seven series to win the Appalachian League playoff championship.

In 1944, the team borrowed the nickname of their Major League Baseball affiliate by becoming the Erwin Cubs. Under Poole, Erwin finished the season with a 45–63 (.417) last-place record. Again, all four teams participated in the playoffs, but the Aces lost their semifinal series to Bristol, three games to one. They lost their final game, 3–2, at Bristol on September 3.

Across both seasons of play, Erwin accumulated a regular season record of 98–116 (.458).

Season-by-season results

Notable players
Five Aces/Cubs also played in at least one game in Major League Baseball during their careers. These players and their seasons with Erwin were:

Herman Fink (1943)
Jim Poole (1943–1944)
Dick Sipek (1943)
Jim Pearce (1944)
Rube Walker (1944)

References

External links
Statistics from Baseball-Reference
Statistics from Stats Crew

1943 establishments in Tennessee
1944 disestablishments in Tennessee
Baseball teams established in 1943
Baseball teams disestablished in 1944
Chicago Cubs minor league affiliates
Defunct Appalachian League teams
Defunct baseball teams in Tennessee
Professional baseball teams in Tennessee